Chile at the 1960 Summer Olympics in Rome, Italy was the nation's eleventh appearance out of fourteen editions of the Summer Olympic Games. The nation was represented by a team of 9 athletes, 8 males and 1 females, that competed in 8 events in 3 sports.

Athletics

Boxing

Shooting

Two shooters represented Chile in 1960.

Trap
 Juan Enrique Lira
 Gilberto Navarro

References

External links
Official Olympic Reports

Nations at the 1960 Summer Olympics
1960
1960 in Chilean sport